Acanthorhachis is an enigmatic extinct genus of chondrichthyan from the Carboniferous period. Its name is derived from the Greek word acanthos meaning "spine" and the Greek suffix for spine, -rhachis. This is due to the spine-like dermal denticles and their subsidiary spines, which coated the exterior of the animal. The authors who erected this genus suggested the common name "The Spiny Spined Shark." It is closely related to Listracanthus. It differs from it in the size, structure, and distribution of dermal spines. It is currently monotypic, containing only the species A. spinatus. This shark is thus far only described from the British Isles. Acanthorhachis was first described from the Westphalian-aged lower coal measures of Yorkshire, England. It occurs rarely in Viséan-aged Eyam Limestone of Derbyshire, England.

References

Carboniferous cartilaginous fish
Carboniferous fish of Europe
Prehistoric cartilaginous fish genera
Fossil taxa described in 2013